Yohan Alexandre Mady Boli (born 17 November 1993) is a professional footballer who plays as a forward for Qatar Stars League side Al-Rayyan. Born in France, Boli represents Ivory Coast internationally.

International career
Boli was born in France and is of Ivorian descent. He debuted for the Ivory Coast in a 2–1 loss to Gabon for 2018 FIFA World Cup qualification on 2 September 2017.

Personal life
Boli is the son of the Ivorian former footballer Roger Boli, nephew of French international footballer Basile Boli, and cousin of Ivorian footballer Yannick Boli. Boli's brothers, Kévin Boli and Charles Boli are also professional footballers.

Career statistics

References

External links
 
 

1993 births
Living people
Sportspeople from Arras
Footballers from Hauts-de-France
Association football forwards
Citizens of Ivory Coast through descent
Ivorian footballers
Ivory Coast international footballers
French footballers
French sportspeople of Ivorian descent
CS Avion players
CS Sedan Ardennes players
K.S.V. Roeselare players
R.C.S. Verviétois players
Sint-Truidense V.V. players
Al-Rayyan SC players
Championnat National 2 players
Belgian Pro League players
Challenger Pro League players
Qatar Stars League players
Boli family
Expatriate footballers in Belgium
Expatriate footballers in Qatar
Ivorian expatriate sportspeople in Belgium
Ivorian expatriate sportspeople in Qatar
French expatriate sportspeople in Belgium
French expatriate sportspeople in Qatar
Ivorian expatriate footballers
French expatriate footballers